Henry Shirley, 3rd Earl Ferrers (14 November 1691– 6 August 1745), known as Hon. Henry Shirley until 1729, was an English nobleman and lunatic.

Shirley was the ninth, but second surviving, son of Robert Shirley, 1st Earl Ferrers. His mental disorder led his younger brother, Laurence, to obtain a commission of lunacy against him. However, Henry's condition improved, and he regained control of his estates in October 1730, the year after he succeeded his brother Washington as Earl Ferrers. While well enough to accept the offices of Lord Lieutenant and Custos Rotulorum of Staffordshire in 1731, he again relapsed into insanity, although he was not removed from office until 1742. He was confined during the last years of his life and died in Kensington Gore in 1745 aged 53. He was succeeded by his nephew Laurence, who would later be executed for killing his steward.

References

|-

1691 births
1745 deaths
03
Lord-Lieutenants of Staffordshire